Tatay is the second release and first full album by Gorky's Zygotic Mynci. It was released in 1994.

Track listing
"Thema o Cartref"
"Beth Sy'n Digwydd i'r Fuwch"
"Tatay"
"Y Ffordd Oren"
"Gwres Prynhawn"
"Amsermaemaiyndod/cinema"
"O, Caroline" (Matching Mole cover)
"Naw. E. Pimp"
"Kevin Ayers"
"When You Hear the Captain Sing"
"O, Caroline" (Euros Childs original with same title as cover; sometimes called 'O Caroline II')
"Tatay (Moog Mix)"
"Anna Apera"
"Gegin Nos"
"Silff Ffenest"
"Backward Dog"
Japanese bonus tracks:
<li>"Suzanne"
<li>"Monica"
<li>"Electric Sailor"
<li>"Cinema"

Personnel

Personnel are taken from CD liner notes.

Euros Childs - vocals, piano, organ, synthesizers, percussion
John Lawrence - guitar, bass, recorder, trumpet, shawm, vocals, percussion
Richard James - bass, guitar, piano, organ, percussion
Megan Childs - violin, vocals
Osian Evans - drums

Al Edwards - drums
Alan Holmes - production, percussion, orchestration
Gorwel Owen - engineering, flute
Emyr Glyn Williams - trumpet

References

1994 albums
Gorky's Zygotic Mynci albums
Welsh-language albums